Clarion Alley Mural Project' (CAMP) is  an artists' collective in San Francisco's Mission District. The mission of CAMP is to support and produce socially engaged and aesthetically innovative public art, locally and globally as a grassroots artist-run organization. CAMP is a community, a public space, and an organizing force that uses public art (murals, street art, performance art, dance, poster projects, literary events) as a means for supporting social, economic, racial, and environmental justice messaging and storytelling. The project is currently co-directed by Megan Wilson and Christopher Statton with a board of directors that includes Wilson, Statton, Shaghayegh Cyrous, Keyvan Shovir, Ivy McClelland, Kyoko Sato, Fara Akrami, and Chris Gazaleh. Clarion Alley runs one block (560 ft long and 15 ft. wide) in San Francisco's inner Mission District between 17th and 18th streets and Mission and Valencia streets.

Origins
CAMP was formed in October 1992 by a volunteer collective of six residents of the North Mission District, San Francisco: Aaron Noble, Michael O'Connor, Sebastiana Pastor, Rigo 92, Mary Gail Snyder, and Aracely Soriano. Inspired by Balmy Alley and other murals and muralists of San Francisco's Mission District, CAMP came together to initiate a mural project on Clarion Alley. At the time, two of the founders were living on the alley, while another had helped found the Balmy Alley project.

While Balmy Alley focused on the theme of Central American struggle, the stated goals of CAMP were social inclusiveness and aesthetic variety. CAMP went on to organize projects off site at the ILWU Local 6 SF headquarters (1995), the Redstone Building (1997), Yogyakarta Indonesia (2003, 2018), and the Roxie Theater (2012), as well as gallery installations at San Francisco Art Institute, New Langton Arts, and Intersection for the Arts.

Collaborations

Sama-Sama/Together

Sama-Sama/Togetheris the first international mural exchange between artists in the United States (San Francisco) and Yogyakarta Indonesia, co-organized by CAMP, Apotik Komik of Indonesia and Intersection for the Arts. The project was designed to foster understanding of recent world events and Muslim and non-Muslim cultures between the two communities through the creation of new works, as well as through cross-cultural dialogue between participating artists and the public at large. Artists from San Francisco included: Aaron Noble, Alicia McCarthy, Andrew Schoultz, Carolyn Castaño, Carolyn Ryder Cooley, and Megan Wilson. Artists from Indonesia included: Arie Dyanto, Arya Panjalu, Nano Warsono, and Samuel Indratma. The project was the catalyst for the mural and graffiti movement in Yogyakarta. The San Francisco Bay Guardian awarded the project “The Best Transnational Art Undertaking” in 2004.

Bangkit/Arise
In 2018 Clarion Alley Mural Project in collaboration with the Asian Art Museum (San Francisco) organized Bangkit/Arise, the second international exchange and residency between artists from the San Francisco Bay Area and Yogyakarta, Indonesia. Artists from San Francisco include Christopher Statton, Kelly Ording, Jet Martinez, Shaghayegh Cyrous, Keyvan Shovir, Jose Guerra Awe, and Megan Wilson. Artists from Yogyakarta include: Nano Warsono, Bambang Toko, Ucup, Wedhar Riyadi, Vina Puspita, and Harind Arvati. The project was designed to address critical issues facing global and local communities, such as community development, land use, environmental crises, housing instability, and geopolitical divisions, using art as a point of departure. Community partners included the village of Panggunharjo, the Institut Seni Indonesia, AROC (Arab Resource and Organizing Center), Coalition on Homelessness, San Francisco, and SOMCAN (South of Market Community Action Network).

List of Clarion Alley participating artists
Below are some of the artists who have been part of the Clarion Alley Mural Project. 

 CK1 ' Keyvan Shovir '
 Cuba
 Brad K. Alder
 Rene Amini
 Anti-Eviction Mapping Project
 APEX
 Tim Armstrong
 Anthony G.
 AQUA
 ATOM
 Tauba Auerbach
 Jose Guerra Awe
 Bahama Kangaroo
 Georgina Barney
 Helen Bayly
 BEMS
 David Benzler
 Amy Berk
 BIGFOOT
 BLIS
 James Bode
 Mark Bode
 Vichian Boonmeemak
 Alex Braubach
 Suzie Buchholz
 CHAOS 938
 Chor Boogie
 Chuy Jesús Campusano
 Carolyn Castaño
 CECIL
 Scott Cowgill
 Carolyn Ryder Cooley
 Andy Cox
 George Crampton
 Shaghayegh Cyrous
 DAGON
 Diana Cristales-David
 Ethan Allen Davis
 Bryan Dawson, Rogelio Martinez, and Sayaka Tagawa
 Diamond Dave
 Matt Day
 Eric Derail
 DESIE
 DNO
 Daniel Doherty
 Emory Douglas
 Christianne Dugan
 DX
 Arie Dyanto
 Ezra Eismont
 Emily (Butterfly)
 EON 75
 ESA
 ESPO
 ESTRIA
 EURO
 Yuka Ezoe
 John Fadeff
 Farhan Siki
 Tom Farthing
 Julio Flores and Luis Lule
 Pablo Fonseca de Pinho
 FREE
 Friends' School
 Amilca Fuentes/American Indian Movement Youth Council
 J Garcia
 C. Gazaleh
 GIANT
 Corrina Goldblatt
 Danny Gotimer
 Chris Granillo
 Susan Greene
 Ruben Guzman
 QR Hand (poem)
 Chad Hasegawa
 Maya Hayuk
 Heart 101
 Cliff Hengst
 Ron Hennegler
 Marisa Hernandez
 Crystal Hermman
 Scott Hewicker
 Horizons Unlimited (class taught by Carolyn Castaño and Amy Berk)
 Horea
 Hospitality House
 Mia Houlberg
 Scott Hove
 Kenneth Huerta
 Victor Hugo
 Samuel Indratama
 IVY
 Marisa Jahn
 Xylor Jane
 Mario Joel
 Chris Johanson
 K2
 Jamila Keba
 Saroun Khan
 Keith Knight
 Mari Kono
 Mei-Tsung Lee
 LOCUST
 LANGO
 Vatos Revere Life
 Michael Loggins and Jamie Morgan
 Alice McGinn
 America Meredith
 Seija Metsola
 LUCHA
 LUNO
 Chris Lux
 MACE
 Scott MacLeod
 Carlos Madriz
 Mark Martin
 Jet Martinez
 Alicia McCarthy
 Barry McGee (TWIST)
 Jessica Miller
 Amilca Mouton-Fuentes (1978-2004)
 Julie Murray
 Natel
 Victor Navarette
 Ruby Neri (Reminisce)
 Aaron Noble
 Sirron Norris
 Ivan Nunez
 Oasis For Girls (Sierra Bloomer, Micaiah Caplong, Su Mei Mai, Sunum Mobin, Nancy Salcedo, Amber Sanchez, Jennifer Tse, Lily Zhen)
 OKAE
 Naoki Onodera
 Onomy
 OOPS
 ORFN US BKF
 Kelly Ording
 Arya Panjalu
 PastTime
 Sebastiana Pastor
 Michaela Pavlátová; Ray Patlán/Eduardo Pineda (Fresco)
 Hilary Pecis
 Jesús Angel Perez
 PEZ
 Poor Magazine
 Precita Eyes Mural Arts Center/Susan Cervantes
 Texta Queen
 Kyle Ranson
 Mike Reger
 Bunnie Reiss
 Renos
 Martin Revolo
 Doug Rhodes
 Rigo
 Brooke Ripley
 Ryan Rivadeneyra
 Clarence Robbs (Cuba)
 Isis Rodriguez
 Cynthia Rojas
 Al Rose (poem)
 Jeff Roydson
 Erin Ruch
 Ron Salmeron
 San Francisco Art Institute (class taught by Kristin Calabrese)
 San Francisco Art Institute (class taught by Aaron Noble & Megan Wilson)
 San Francisco Print Collective
 Andrew Schoultz
 Mary Scott
 Stev Sechovec
 Daniel Segoria
 SESI
 Steve Shada
 Christine Shields
 Aminah Slor
 Greta Snider
 SnoMonkey
 Spenser
 Spie
 Christopher Statton
 Mats Stromberg
 Shilo Suleman
 Alfonso Texidor
 Gabriel Thormann
 Sara Thustra
 Brian and Jasper Tripp
 TWICK
 UFO
 Smael Vagner
 Lucena Valle
 Vatos Mexicanos Locos
 Josh Wallace
 WARNED
 Nano Warsono
 Mel C. Waters
 Scott Williams
 Bradley Wilson
 Megan Wilson
 Tanya Wischerath
 Lena Wolff
 Nina Wrights
 Rebecca Young
 Daisy Zamora (poem)
 Zore & Hyde
 Zulah

See also
Mission School

Notes

References
Murray, Julie.  "Moving Stairway to Heaven" in Street Art San Francisco: Mission Muralismo. Jacoby, Annice, ed. NY: Abrams, 2009. p. 126
Noble, Aaron.  "The Clarion Alley Mural Project" p. 113 and "Vatos Mexicanos Locos" p. 122 in Street Art San Francisco: Mission Muralismo. Jacoby, Annice, ed. New York: Abrams, 2009.
Wilson, Megan. "Sama-Sama: Mural Missionaries" p. 170 - 171 in Street Art San Francisco: Mission Muralismo. Jacoby, Annice, ed. New York: Abrams, 2009.
Rapoport, Lynn. "Wall space: The Clarion Alley Mural Project uses public art to paint a home." San Francisco Bay Guardian, October 23, 2002.
Drescher, Timothy W. "Clarion Alley and Post-modernism."

External links
 Clarion Alley Mural Project Official Website
 Flickr Photo Pool
  Clarion Alley Gallery on Found SF
 Photos from the 2006 Clarion Alley Block Party

American artist groups and collectives
Arts organizations based in the San Francisco Bay Area
Mission District, San Francisco
Arts organizations established in 1992
1992 establishments in California